Thomas Edgar Corning,  (April 11, 1842 – August 9, 1912) was a lawyer and political figure in Nova Scotia, Canada. He represented Yarmouth County in the Nova Scotia House of Assembly as a Conservative member from 1882 to 1886.

He was born in Chegoggin, Yarmouth County, Nova Scotia, the son of Nelson Corning and Sarah Murphy, and was educated at Acadia College. He was called to the bar in 1869. In 1880, Corning married Jane Alden Baxter. He was named a Queen's Counsel in 1890. He served as treasurer and solicitor for Yarmouth from 1874 to 1890. From 1890 until 1912, he was recorder for the town of Yarmouth. Corning ran unsuccessfully for a seat in the House of Commons in 1900, 1902 and 1904. He died in Yarmouth at the age of 70.

References
The Canadian parliamentary companion, 1883 JA Gemmill
 A Directory of the Members of the Legislative Assembly of Nova Scotia, 1758-1958, Public Archives of Nova Scotia (1958)

1842 births
People from Yarmouth County
Progressive Conservative Association of Nova Scotia MLAs
1912 deaths
Canadian King's Counsel